Okon Flo Essien (born December 31, 1981) is a former Nigerian professional footballer.

Club career
He made his debut in the Russian Premier League in 2001 for FC Spartak Moscow and played 2 games in the 2002–03 UEFA Champions League.

Honours
 Nigerian FA Cup winner: 2001.
 Russian Premier League champion: 2001.
 Russian Cup winner: 2003.

References

1981 births
Living people
People from Calabar
Nigerian footballers
Nigerian expatriate footballers
Dolphin F.C. (Nigeria) players
Nigerian expatriate sportspeople in Russia
FC Spartak Moscow players
Sharks F.C. players
Expatriate footballers in Russia
Nigerian expatriate sportspeople in Vietnam
Calabar Rovers F.C. players
Expatriate footballers in Vietnam
Russian Premier League players
Dong Thap FC players
Association football forwards